Algoma Coal and Coke Company Store, also known as Tug River Health Clinic, is a historic company store building located at Algoma, McDowell County, West Virginia.  It was built in the 1948 to a design by Welch architect Hassel T. Hicks. It is a two-story building with a flat roof, with exterior walls of glazed yellow tile with alternating bands of red brick in the Moderne style.  It originally housed a store and offices and has also been home to a health clinic.

It was listed on the National Register of Historic Places in 1992.

References

Commercial buildings completed in the 20th century
Commercial buildings on the National Register of Historic Places in West Virginia
Moderne architecture in West Virginia
National Register of Historic Places in McDowell County, West Virginia
Company stores in the United States